Palézieux railway station serves the village of Palézieux, within the municipality of Oron, in the canton of Vaud, Switzerland. The station is located at the junction of the standard gauge Lausanne–Bern and Palézieux–Lyss lines of Swiss Federal Railways (SBB),  from Lausanne. The station is also the terminus of the  gauge Palézieux–Bulle–Montbovon line of Transports publics Fribourgeois. Palézieux's other station, is located to the north on the Palézieux–Lyss line.

The station has two parts, one for the national railways (SBB) and the other for the metre gauge line; it is the only station on the Transports publics Fribourgeois network which is in the canton of Vaud. There are three through-platforms on the SBB mainline, with further platforms at the adjacent metre gauge railway terminus. The station is staffed by SBB Monday to Friday. There are 179 car parking spaces.

Services
 the following services stop at Palézieux:

 RER Vaud:

References

External links
 
 

Railway stations in the canton of Vaud
Swiss Federal Railways stations
Railway stations in Switzerland opened in 1862